Elzunia humboldt is a species of butterfly of the family Nymphalidae, subfamily Danainae, tribus Ithomiini.

Description
This species is quite variable depending on the subspecies. The uppersides of the wings are black, with a series of small white spots on the margins. At the base of the hindwings usually there is a broad yellow band, while in the middle of the forewings usually there are one or more white spots. The undersides of the wings have a similar pattern to the uppersides, but the basic colour is reddish instead of black and the hindwings usually have two series of white spots.

Distribution
This species can be found in Colombia, Ecuador and Peru.

Subspecies
 E. h. humboldt (Colombia)
 E. h. bonplandii (Guérin-Méneville, [1844]) (Colombia)
 E. h. cassandrina Srnka, 1884 (Ecuador)
 E. h. regalis (Stichel, 1903) (Colombia)
 E. h. albomaculata (Haensch, 1903) (Ecuador)
 E. h. joiceyi (Kaye, 1918) (Colombia)
 E. h. atahualpa Fox, 1956 (Peru)
 E. h. judsoni Fox, 1956 (Peru)

Etymology
The butterfly was named to honour the German explorer Alexander von Humboldt.

References

"Elzunia humboldt (Latreille, 1809)" at BioLib.cz
"Elzunia Bryk, 1937" at Markku Savela's Lepidoptera and Some Other Life Forms
Butterflies of America

External links
Flickr.com

Ithomiini
Nymphalidae of South America
Lepidoptera of Colombia
Lepidoptera of Ecuador